Sir John Hynde Cotton, 3rd Baronet (bap. 1686 – 1752) of Madingley Hall, Cambridgeshire was an English landowner and Tory politician who  sat in the English and British House of Commons for 44 years from 1708 to 1752. The historian Eveline Cruickshanks called him "one of the most zealous Jacobites in England".

Early life
Cotton was baptized on 7 April 1686, the eldest and only surviving son of Sir John Cotton, 2nd Baronet, of Landwade and Madingley Hall, Cambridgeshire who had been MP for Cambridge. He was educated at Westminster School and was admitted at Emmanuel College, Cambridge on 29 September 1701 and awarded MA in 1705. He succeeded to the baronetcy and Madingley Hall on the death of his father on 15 January 1713. He adopted the surname of Hynde Cotton in deference to the Hynde family, traditional owners of the Hall: his paternal grandfather, the first Baronet, had married into the Hynde family.

Politics
Cotton was returned as the Member of Parliament for Cambridge for 1708–1722 followed by terms as the member for Cambridgeshire for 1722–1727, Cambridge again for 1727–1741 and Marlborough for 1741–1752.

After an MP deserted the Tories and made a speech loyal to Sir Robert Walpole, Cotton criticised him to Walpole, saying "That young dog promised that he would always stand by us". Sir Robert replied: "I advise my young men never to use always". "Yet", said Cotton, stammering, "you yourself are very apt to make use of all ways".

Horace Walpole wrote that Cotton "had wit and the faithful attendant of wit, ill nature; and was the greatest master of the arts of the House, where he seldom made but short speeches, having a stammering in his elocution, which however he knew how to manage with humour. In the end of Queen Anne's reign he was in place; during Sir Robert Walpole's administration constantly and warmly in opposition; and was so determined a Jacobite, that though on the late coalition he accepted a place in the household and held it two years, he never gave a vote with the court, which argued nice distinction, not only in taking the oaths to the King (for that all the Jacobites in Parliament do) but in taking his pay and yet obstructing his service: and as nice in the King's ministers, who could discover the use of making a man accept a salary, without changing his party".

Private life

Cotton married firstly (with c.£8,500) Lettice Crowley, daughter of Sir Ambrose Crowley of Greenwich on 24 May 1714. The couple were married by the Archbishop of York at St Mary's Church, Kensington. She died in August 1718 and he married secondly Margaret Craggs, the daughter of James Craggs on 3 June 1724. He was succeeded in the baronetcy by his only surviving son, John Hynde Cotton, child of his first wife.

They lived at Madingley Hall for 40 years during which time he transformed it from a panelled Tudor house into a Baroque building.

Notes

 

1686 births
1752 deaths
People from Cambridgeshire
People educated at Westminster School, London
Alumni of Emmanuel College, Cambridge
Baronets in the Baronetage of England
Members of the Parliament of Great Britain for English constituencies
Tory MPs (pre-1834)
British MPs 1708–1710
British MPs 1710–1713
British MPs 1713–1715
British MPs 1715–1722
British MPs 1722–1727
British MPs 1727–1734
British MPs 1734–1741
British MPs 1741–1747
British MPs 1747–1754
English Jacobites